The Lion in Winter is a 2003 made-for-television remake of the 1966 stage play of the same name and of the original 1968 screen version of the play which featured Peter O'Toole and Katharine Hepburn.

The film was first shown on December 26, 2003, in the UK and premiered on U.S. television on May 26, 2004. It starred Patrick Stewart and Glenn Close, and was directed by Andrei Konchalovsky. It was filmed on location at Spiš Castle in eastern Slovakia, interiors were filmed in Budapest, Hungary.

Andrew Howard, John Light, and Rafe Spall played the warring brothers. Jonathan Rhys Meyers played the king of France and Julia Vysotskaya, his sister and Henry's mistress, Princess Alais.

Plot
In the year 1183, King Henry II of England, who also rules large parts of France within his Angevin Empire, has invited his three surviving sons, his imprisoned and estranged wife Queen Eleanor and the king of France, who has recently come of age, to join him at his Christmas court at Chinon Castle. His eldest son Henry has died and now the king must decide upon a new heir. King Henry favours his youngest John. Eleanor favours the oldest son Richard.
The film shows the intra-family disputes which take place over the next few days. At the end, everyone disperses with nothing resolved for the future.

Cast
 Patrick Stewart as King Henry II
 Glenn Close as Queen Eleanor
 Andrew Howard as Richard the Lionheart
 John Light as Geoffrey
 Rafe Spall as John
 Jonathan Rhys Meyers as King Philip II
 Julia Vysotskaya as Alais
 Clive Wood as Captain William Marshall

Reception

Brian Lowry of Variety wrote that the film "is a long sit but nevertheless a rewarding one". Of Close's performance, he wrote that "her Eleanor manages to stand apart from Hepburn's".

Awards and nominations

Won
Primetime Emmy Awards
Outstanding Costumes – Miniseries, Movie, or Special

Golden Globe Awards
Best Actress – Miniseries or Television Film (Close)

Screen Actors Guild Awards
Outstanding Female Actor – Television Movie or Miniseries (Close)

Nominated
Costume Designers Guild
 Excellence in Costume Design for Television – Fantasy or Period

Primetime Emmy Awards
 Outstanding Made for Television Movie
 Outstanding Actress – Miniseries or Movie (Close)
 Outstanding Directing – Miniseries, Movie, or Dramatic Special
 Outstanding Art Direction – Miniseries, Movie, or Special
 Outstanding Hairstyling – Miniseries, Movie, or Special

Golden Globe Awards
 Best Miniseries or Television Film
 Best Actor – Miniseries or Television Film (Stewart)

Producers Guild of America Awards
Television Producer of the Year Award – Longform

See also
 List of historical drama films
 The Lion in Winter (play)
 The Lion in Winter (1968 film)

References

External links
 
 
 

2003 television films
2003 films
2003 drama films
American drama films
American LGBT-related television films
American Christmas films
Films about dysfunctional families
Films set in castles
Films set in France
Films set in the 12th century
Films shot in Slovakia
Films shot in Budapest
Films shot in Hungary
Films directed by Andrei Konchalovsky
Henry II of England
Biographical films about English royalty
Cultural depictions of Richard I of England
Cultural depictions of Eleanor of Aquitaine
Cultural depictions of John, King of England
Television shows based on plays
Television remakes of films
American remakes of British films
2000s English-language films
2000s American films